Baghmisheh gate, also transliterated as Baghmasha, is an old  gate in the  Bazaar suburb of Tabriz, north-western Iran. 

Until modern times, the city was protected by  a defensive wall. There were just four main gates  (Bghmasha, Gajil, Mahad mahin, Khiyaban. Istanbul, and Nobar). Of these, just Baghmisha gate survives  today.

See also
 Baghmisheh
 Azarbaijan Museum

Gates
Buildings and structures in Tabriz